The Royal London Mutual Insurance Society Limited, along with its subsidiaries, is the largest mutual insurer in the United Kingdom, with Group funds under management of over £150 billion. Group businesses provide around nine million policies and employ 4046 people, as of June 2019.

Group
Royal London is the largest mutual life, pensions and investment company in the UK, while also providing protection products in Ireland.

Offices

Royal London is registered in England with its head office in the City of London. It has other large offices in Alderley Park and Edinburgh, with smaller offices in Glasgow, Dublin, Lichfield & Liverpool.

History

Founded in 1861 by Joseph Degge and Henry Ridge in a London coffee shop, Royal London was initially set up as a friendly society dedicated to serving the interest of its members and securing their financial security. Royal London became a mutual life assurance society in 1908.

Other elements of the modern business are older than the primary brand: for example Royal Liver Assurance was founded in 1850, while the Irish business, until recently branded as Caledonian Life dates back to 1824, and represents the Caledonian Insurance Company founded in Edinburgh in 1805.

Royal London Asset Management (RLAM) a wholly owned subsidiary of the group was founded in 1988. RLAM employs 76 investment professionals, based in the company's London office.

Sponsorship

In 2013, Royal London signed a four-year deal to sponsor one day cricket in England and Wales, including domestic and international fixtures.

Acquisitions

On 31 December 2000 Royal London took over United Assurance Group plc. The transaction was the largest acquisition of a quoted UK company by a mutual. United Assurance Group itself had been formed by the merger of United Friendly and Refuge Assurance in October 1996.

On 2 October 2000 it was announced that Royal London would acquire Scottish Life, the Edinburgh-based pension specialist. Transfer took place on 1 July 2001.

In March 2003 Royal London launched a new start up protection business, Bright Grey based in Edinburgh. 
 
In May 2008 Royal London concluded a transaction to acquire the open businesses of Resolution. These were the protection businesses Scottish Provident and Scottish Mutual; Phoenix Life Assurance Limited (formerly Abbey National Life) and Scottish Provident International.

At the beginning of 2009 the offshore businesses Scottish Provident International and Scottish Life International were combined to form a new entity, Royal London 360° based in the Isle of Man. This business was subject to a management buyout in November 2013. Royal London 360° rebranded to RL360° soon after the MBO.

In 2010 Royal London announced that it was in talks with Royal Liver Assurance over a possible acquisition.  Terms were agreed in 2011 and the delegates of Royal Liver voted for the takeover at their AGM on 12 May 2011 and the transfer was completed on 1 July.

In 2013 The Co-operative Group agreed to sell its life & pensions and asset management businesses to Royal London.  The proposed transaction gained the approval of Royal London members at an EGM in June 2013 and gained regulatory approval on 31 July 2013.

In 2015 Caledonian Life, the group’s Irish business rebranded to become Royal London Ireland.

At the end of 2015, Royal London completed the rebrand of its two UK protection businesses, Bright Grey and Scottish Provident to a new Royal London protection brand. This completed the group’s journey to become a single Royal London brand.

In 2020 Royal London purchased Police Mutual and Forces Mutual.

References

External links
Catalogue of the Royal London Staff Association archives, held at the Modern Records Centre, University of Warwick

Mutual insurance companies
British companies established in 1861
Financial services companies established in 1861
Life insurance companies of the United Kingdom
1861 establishments in England